Seoul Forest is a large park in Seongdong-gu, Seoul, South Korea. It is open year-round, and admission is free. Seoul Forest opened in June 2005. The city government spent 235.2 billion won in development. It is the third largest park in Seoul city. Seoul Forest is a massive park dotted with over 400,000 trees and 100 different animals. This nature park is located in Seongsu-dong and covers an area of The area that was once a royal hunting forest, became Seoul's first water purification plant in 1908, and later used for both racecourse and golf facilities. Now, it has been transformed into a park with a dense canopy of trees and a lake, where citizen can breathe the invigorating fresh air offered by nature.

The park is served by Seoul Subway Line 2, Ttukseom station, exit 8 or Bundang Line, Seoul-forest station, exit 3. Proceed straight until you get to the large street and turn left. About a block down, across the street, is the park. It is available to ride bicycles, skate board and so on. It was established to satisfy people's desire to have green space and recreational places in city. It changed from the grounds of Ttukseom. It consists of five parks : a Cultural Art Park, an Ecological Forest, a Nature Experience Study Field, Wetlands Ecological Field, and Han River Waterside Park.

This Ecologic Park has over 40 different species of roses. This park offers visitors the opportunity to stroll along the river and admire these colorful, intoxicating flowers, while also viewing some fish along the way. Roses are an attractions at this park located on Ttukseom Island. Park goers can also see groves of wetland plant species, including reeds, silver banner grass, and rose-gold pussy willows. 
There are different types of water plants, such as water chestnut and floating moss, can be found in downstream areas where the waters flow by gently.
Along with these sights, Seoul Forest also features as insect garden in its nature experiencing study field and outdoor nature classroom for children in its Wetlands Ecological Field.

Since August 2017, Seongdong-gu has implemented a policy to restrict entry to large companies and franchise companies in the area of Seoul Forest Road in Seongsu-dong. Seongdong-gu restricted the entry of large companies, franchise headquarters, or franchise-type rest restaurants (large coffee shops), general restaurants (large buffet restaurants), bakeries, and cosmetics stores in Seongsu 1-ga 2-dong. Such measures were based on the district unit plan around Ttukseom Island and the ordinance on the designation of local community cooperation and sustainable development zones, and Seongdong-gu is the first to restrict entry to district unit plans and ordinances outside of central Seoul.

Attractions 

 Cultural Art Park
 Hangang River Waterside Park
 Nature Experiencing Study Field
 Wetlands Ecological Field
 Ecological Forest: It opens every 5:30~21:30 
 An insect botanical garden: It opens every 10:00~17:00 (Closed every Monday)
 Butterfly Garden: It opens every 10:00~17:00 (Closed every Monday)

Transport 
The park is served by Seoul Subway Line 2, Ttukseom station, exit eight or Bundang Line, Seoul-forest station, exit three.

References

External links

Seoul Forest: Official Seoul City Tourism

Seongdong District
Parks in Seoul
Urban public parks
Urban forests in South Korea